Gephyromantis leucomaculatus, commonly known as the white-spotted Madagascar frog, is a species of frog in the family Mantellidae.  It is endemic to Madagascar.  Its natural habitat is subtropical or tropical moist lowland forests.  It is threatened by habitat loss.

References

leucomaculatus
Endemic fauna of Madagascar
Taxa named by Jean Marius René Guibé
Taxonomy articles created by Polbot
Amphibians described in 1975